Lips Like Morphine was first released on May 16, 2006, by the Chicago-based band Kill Hannah and then again released in August on the band's album Until There's Nothing Left of Us. It is available via paid download from several online music retailers, including the iTunes Music Store. The first release included demo versions of "Rebel Yell". On June 13, 2006, the correct version of "Rebel Yell" was put up. It was thought at first that the wrong version of "Goodnight, Goodbye" was released on this EP. This was due to its appearance on a rare promo called 1993–1999 which had an early mix on it. The version on this EP is the correct and final version.

Track listing
Original release (May 16, 2006)
 "Lips Like Morphine" – 3:44
 ""Rebel Yell" – 4:41 (Billy Idol cover)
 "Goodnight, Goodbye" – 3:40
 "Kennedy (Hilton Is the New Kennedy Redo)" – 5:21

Corrected release (June 13, 2006)
 "Lips Like Morphine" – 3:44
 "Rebel Yell" – 4:48
 "Goodnight, Goodbye" – 3:40
 "Kennedy (Hilton Is the New Kennedy Redo)" – 5:21

Kill Hannah albums
2006 EPs
Atlantic Records EPs